Onoff (originally named Telecall) was a Swedish retail chain selling consumer electronics and major appliances. Founded in 1971, and later expanding into Finland and Estonia, the Swedish parent business went bankrupt in 2011, with some stores being purchased by rival chain Expert.

However,  the group's former Estonian subsidiary continues operating under the Onoff name following a management buyout in 2011.

History

Early years

The business was started in 1971 by Hans Westin, who imported Japanese audio products, and in 1973 the company went full-time. The first actual store was opened in 1976 in Åkersberga.

The Onoff name was established in 1982 when the company - then known as Telecall - bought up Sigges radio and changed its name to Onoff. In 1985, a head office was built in Upplands Väsby.

Finland and Estonia

In 2001, Onoff established operations and shops in Finland and Estonia.

A large part of Onoffs' revenue came from consumer finance business Resursgruppen they ran with SIBA. Resursgruppen operations include consumer credit and insurance when buying electronics via chain stores. In 2005, gains from this aspect of the business were greater than from the companies' sale of goods themselves.

Bankruptcy

On 11 July 2011 it was announced via press release that the company had filed for bankruptcy in the Attunda courthouse. Stores in Estonia were part of a subsidiary and not affected by the bankruptcy. The bankruptcy administrator announced that the entire company would be sold with the 6 stores in Estonia together with the 67 Swedish stores and a central warehouse. The Onoff brand was not included in the deal.

The group's Estonian subsidiary was purchased through a management buyout in 2011 and still continues to operate under the Onoff name .

On 20 July 2011, the Swedish operation of consumer electronics chain Expert announced they would buy 30 of the total 67 stores and the central warehouse. From 1 August 2011, these stores became part of the Expert chain. Expert estimated with this takeover they would have a market share in Sweden of about 12-13 percent. The Swedish Expert chain filed for bankruptcy on 18 September 2012.

See also
List of companies of Sweden

External links
 Onoff Estonia

References

Consumer electronics retailers
Retail companies established in 1971